There are over 20,000 Grade II* listed buildings in England. This page is a list of these buildings in the district of Dartford in Kent.

Listed buildings

|}

See also

 Grade I listed buildings in Dartford (borough)
 Grade II* listed buildings in Kent
 Grade II* listed buildings in Sevenoaks (district)
 Grade II* listed buildings in Gravesham
 Grade II* listed buildings in Tonbridge and Malling
 Grade II* listed buildings in Medway
 Grade II* listed buildings in Maidstone (borough)
 Grade II* listed buildings in Tunbridge Wells (borough)
 Grade II* listed buildings in Swale
 Grade II* listed buildings in Ashford (borough)
 Grade II* listed buildings in City of Canterbury
 Grade II* listed buildings in Shepway
 Grade II* listed buildings in Thanet
 Grade II* listed buildings in Dover (district)

Notes

External links

Lists of Grade II* listed buildings in Kent
Grade II* listed buildings in Kent
Grade II* listed buildings